Hilbersdorf is a former municipality in Saxony, Germany. With effect from 1 January 2012, it has merged with Bobritzsch, forming the new municipality of Bobritzsch-Hilbersdorf.

References 

Former municipalities in Saxony
Mittelsachsen